Acidovorax aerodenitrificans is a bacterium from the genus of Acidovorax and the family of Comamonadaceae.

References

Comamonadaceae
Undescribed species